Oak Hill Cemetery is a cemetery located in Lake Placid, Florida, United States. The city-owned cemetery has over 3,000 interments.

References

External links
 
 Lake Placid Oak Hill Cemetery in Lake Placid, Florida CountyOffice.org
 

Cemeteries in Florida
Protected areas of Highlands County, Florida